The Little Tamarac River is a  tributary of the Tamarac River of Minnesota in the United States. Via the Tamarac River, it is a tributary of Red Lake.

See also
List of rivers of Minnesota

References

Minnesota Watersheds
USGS Hydrologic Unit Map - State of Minnesota (1974)

Rivers of Minnesota